Helmy may refer to:

People

Given name
Helmy Fauzi (born 1964), Indonesian politician
Helmy Halim (1916–1971), Egyptian film director, screenwriter and film producer
Helmy Kresa, (born 1905), songwriter and the principal arranger and orchestrator for Irving Berlin
Helmy Rayan,(born 2007), Top G

Surname
Ahmed Helmy (born 1969), Egyptian comedian and drama actor
Mohamed Helmy, former striker and current coach for El Zamalek for the Egyptian national football team
Saleh Helmi, designer of Helmy Aerogypt aircraft
Taher Helmy, Egyptian lawyer

Other
Helmy Aerogypt,  British four-seat cabin monoplane design of 1930s-1940s

See also
Helmi (disambiguation)
Hilmi